The Illinois–Indiana League or Two–I League was based in  Illinois and Indiana and refers the name of two different baseball circuits in Minor league baseball which operated in  and . The league was renamed to the Illinois-Iowa League in 1890 and 1891.

Cities represented/Teams
1889

1892

Standings & statistics
1889 Illinois–Indiana League
 Bloomington disbanded June 15; Decatur was dropped June 16.; Logansport disbanded and was replaced by Champaign–Urbana. Finals: Terre Haute 4 games, Danville 0, one tie.
1892 Illinois-Indiana League - schedule
Peoria (17–8) moved to Aurora May 31; Aurora disbanded July 5; Quincy disbanded June 24; Evansville disbanded July 8; Terre Haute disbanded July 10.

Sources
Baseball Reference Encyclopedia and History

Defunct minor baseball leagues in the United States
Baseball leagues in Illinois
Baseball leagues in Indiana
Sports leagues established in 1889
Sports leagues disestablished in 1892